Lê Ngọc Nguyên Nhung (born 12 February 1984) is a Vietnamese badminton player. She joined the Ho Chi Minh City team in 1996, and was a part of the National team at the 2001, 2003, 2005, and 2009 Southeast Asian Games. She was the National Champion in the women's singles event in 2007–2009, and also in the women's doubles event in 2009. In 2008, she competed at the 2008 Olympic Games in Beijing, China, but lost in the first round.

Achievements

BWF International Challenge/Series 
Women's singles

Women's doubles

  BWF International Challenge tournament
  BWF International Series tournament
  BWF Future Series tournament

References

External links 
 

1984 births
Living people
Sportspeople from Ho Chi Minh City
Vietnamese female badminton players
Badminton players at the 2008 Summer Olympics
Olympic badminton players of Vietnam
Competitors at the 2001 Southeast Asian Games
Competitors at the 2003 Southeast Asian Games
Competitors at the 2005 Southeast Asian Games
Competitors at the 2009 Southeast Asian Games
Southeast Asian Games bronze medalists for Vietnam
Southeast Asian Games medalists in badminton
21st-century Vietnamese women